CHL may refer to:

Ice hockey

Current leagues
 Canadian Hockey League (1975–present), the umbrella organization for Canadian major junior hockey
 Central Hockey League, now the Central Canada Hockey League (1961–present), a Junior A ice hockey league
 Champions Hockey League, an ice hockey tournament launched in the 2014–15 season
 Kontinental Hockey League (2007–present), successor to the Russian Superleague, an international professional ice hockey league comprising teams from Russia and Europe

Defunct leagues
 Central Hockey League (1925–1926), a Senior Amateur ice league hockey that operated in the United States and Canada
 Central Hockey League (1931–1935), a minor professional ice hockey league that operated in the United States
 Central Hockey League (1963–1984), a minor professional ice hockey league that operated in the United States
 Central Hockey League (1992–2014), a minor professional ice hockey league that operated in the United States and Canada prior to merging with the ECHL
 Champions Hockey League (2008–09), a short-lived ice hockey tournament
 Coloured Hockey League (1894–1930), an all-black ice hockey league that operated in Nova Scotia
 Colonial Hockey League (1991–1997), a minor professional ice hockey league in the United States and Canada, became United Hockey League

Science and technology
 Chain Home Low, a radar system used by the British Royal Air Force during World War II
 Chlorite, a group of phyllosilicate minerals
 Chlorophyll, a pigment used by nearly all plants to absorb light for photosynthesis
 Classic Hodgkin's lymphoma, cancer originating from white blood cells
 Conductive hearing loss, a hearing disorder where there is a problem conducting sound waves through parts of the ear
 Computational system for human language (CHL), a concept proposed by Noam Chomsky under his Minimalist program

Organisations
 Centre Hospitalier de Luxembourg, the public-sector healthcare provider in Luxembourg City
 China Mobile (New York Stock Exchange symbol, and on American Depository Receipts)

Other uses
 California Historical Landmark, a designation for historic sites in California, US
 Chile (ISO 3166-1 3-letter country code CHL), a country in South America 
 Concealed Handgun License, a legal authorization to carry concealed handguns used in some US states
 County Hall, London, in the United Kingdom

See also
 Canadian Hockey League (disambiguation)
 Central Hockey League (disambiguation)
 Continental Hockey League (disambiguation)